Mirbat Sports Club is an Omani sports club based in Mirbat, Oman. Their home ground is Al-Saada Stadium, but they also recognize the older Salalah Sports Complex as their home ground. Both stadiums are government owned, but they also own their own personal stadium and sports equipment, as well as their own training facilities.

Being a multisport club
Although being mainly known for their football, Mirbat SC like many other clubs in Oman, have not only football in their list, but also hockey, volleyball, handball, basketball, badminton and squash. They also have a youth football team competing in the Omani Youth league.

Colors, kit providers and sponsorships
Mirbat SC have been known since establishment to wear a full white (with red stripes) kit (usually a darker shade of red), varying themselves from neighbors Al-Nasr SC (Blue kit),  Al-Ittihad (Green kit) and Dhofar (Red kit). They have also had many different sponsors over the years. As of now, Adidas provides them with kits.

Club performance-International Competitions

AFC competitions
Asian Club Championship : 1 appearance
1994–95 : Second Round

References

External links
Club Info at Goalzz.com

Football clubs in Oman
Omani League
Salalah